Jeu de cartes (also known in English as A Card Game, Game of Cards, or Card Party) is a ballet in "three deals" by Igor Stravinsky based on a libretto he co-wrote with Nikita Malayev, a friend of his eldest son Théodore. It was commissioned in November 1935, written late the next year, and premiered by the American Ballet at the old Metropolitan Opera House in New York on 27 April 1937 with the composer conducting. Its European premiere followed on 13 October at the Semperoper in Dresden, where Karl Böhm conducted the Staatskapelle Dresden. 

The idea of basing the ballet on a game of poker did not occur to Stravinsky until after August 1936, when the story took shape. The main character is the deceitful Joker who fancies himself unbeatable owing to his ability to transform into any card.

Structure 
The ballet's three scenes are referred to as "deals" in the score. It can be further partitioned by its tempo markings:

 
1. First Deal (Première donne)
 Introduction. Alla breve
 Pas d'action. Meno mosso
 Dance variation. Moderato assai
 Dance of the Joker. Stringendo
 Waltz-Coda. Tranquillo

2. Second Deal (Deuxième  donne)
 Introduction. Alla breve
 March. Marcia
 Variation I. Allegretto
 Variation II
 Variation III
 Variation IV
 Variation V. Sostenuto e pesante
 Coda. Più mosso
 Reprise of March. Marcia
 Ensemble. Con moto

3. Third Deal (Troisième  donne).
 Introduction. Alla breve
 Waltz. Valse
 Battle between Spades and Hearts. Presto
 Final Dance
 Coda. Tempo del principio

Casts

Original 
 Annabelle Lyon
 Leda Anchutina
 Ariel Lang
 Hortense Kahrklin
 William Dollar

Reviews 
 NY Times review by Anna Kisselgoff, May 30, 1992

References

Sources

External links 

Ballets by Igor Stravinsky
Ballets by George Balanchine
1937 ballet premieres
1937 compositions
Neoclassicism (music)